Eta Chamaeleontis, Latinized from η Chamaeleontis, is a star in the constellation Chamaeleon. It has an apparent magnitude of about 5.5, meaning that it is just barely visible to the naked eye. Based upon parallax measurements, this star is located some  light years (95 parsecs) away from the Sun.

Eta Chamaeleontis has a spectral type of B8V, meaning it is a B-type main sequence star. Stars of this type are typically a few times more massive than the Sun and have effective temperatures of about 10,000 to 30,000 K. Eta Chamaeleontis is just over 3 times more massive than the Sun and has a temperature of about 12,000 K.

Eta Chamaeleontis cluster
Eta Chamaeleontis is the brightest and most massive member of the eponymous Eta Chamaeleontis cluster (also known as the Eta Chamaeleontis association or Mamajek 1, pronounced ), a very nearby (316 light years), and young (8 million years old) stellar moving group discovered in 1999. The cluster contains nearly 20 stellar members spread out over a 40-arcminute diameter region of sky, including the neighboring A-type star HD 75505 and the eclipsing binary RS Cha. The eclipsing binary RS Cha is a well-constrained system which enables precise age-dating, which recent results yield an age of 9 million years. All of the low-mass members (including RS Cha) are pre-main sequence, and several of them appear to still be accreting from protoplanetary disks. Although containing only about 20 members, the cluster appears
to be the densest stellar cluster within 100 pc (~30 solar masses per cubic parsec).

References

General
http://www.alcyone.de/cgi-bin/search.pl?object=HR3502 
http://server3.wikisky.org/starview?object_type=1&object_id=2968
http://simbad.u-strasbg.fr/simbad/sim-basic?Ident=HR+3502&submit=SIMBAD+search
 "WEBDA open cluster database entry for Mamajek 1"

Chamaeleontis, Eta
Chamaeleon (constellation)
Chamaeleontis, Eta
Durchmusterung objects
075416
042637
3502